The Great River Ridge State Trail is a multi-use recreational rail trail in southeastern Minnesota, United States.  It is planned to run  from the city of Plainview through Elgin to Eyota on the former right-of-way of a branch line of the Chicago and North Western Railway.  Currently the final  leading into Eyota are incomplete, but the rest of the route is paved and, south of Elgin, includes a parallel unpaved trackway for horseback riders and snowmobiles.  An extension providing access to Carley State Park is also planned.

References

External links
 Great River Ridge State Trail

Minnesota state trails
Protected areas of Olmsted County, Minnesota
Protected areas of Wabasha County, Minnesota
Rail trails in Minnesota